The Georgian National Handball Federation (GNHF) is the administrative and controlling body for handball and beach handball in Georgia. Founded in 1956, GNHF is a member of European Handball Federation (EHF) and the International Handball Federation (IHF).

National teams
 Georgia men's national handball team
 Georgia men's national junior handball team
 Georgia women's national handball team

Competitions hosted
GNHF had hosted following international championships:

References

External links
 Official website  
 Georgia at the IHF website.
 Georgia at the EHF website.

Handball
Sports organizations established in 1956
1956 establishments in the Soviet Union
Handball governing bodies
European Handball Federation
National members of the International Handball Federation